Good Dreams is the 12th studio album by the Pillows, released on November 3, 2004. The album was produced by Zin Yoshida of Salon Music.

Track listing
"Xavier" – 2:00 
"Walkin' on the Spiral" – 3:25 
"Sono Mirai wa Ima" (その未来は今) – 3:26
"You Stood There, Like an Angel" (天使みたいにキミは立ってた) – 3:12 
"Orange Film Garden" (オレンジ・フィルム・ガーデン) – 4:46
"Frontiers" (フロンティアーズ) – 2:55
"Lo-fi Boy, Fighter Girl" (ローファイボーイ, ファイターガール) – 3:01
"New Year's Eve" – 3:41
"Bad Dreams" – 2:49
"Good Dreams" – 4:45
"Rosy Head" – 2:48

References

The Pillows albums
2004 albums
King Records (Japan) albums